Fire theft may refer to:

 The theft of fire for the benefit of humanity as a mythological theme.
 The Fire Theft rock band and its self-titled album.